Dichomeris rasilella is a moth in the family Gelechiidae. It is found in China (Shaanxi, Zhejiang), Taiwan, Korea, Japan, Russia and Europe, where it has been recorded from Spain, France, Italy, Estonia, Latvia, Ukraine, Belarus, Poland, Romania, the Czech Republic and Slovakia.

The larvae feed on Artemisia vulgaris var. orientalis, Artemisia vulgaris var. indica, Artemisia pontica, Centaurea species and Acosta rhenana.

References

Moths described in 1854
rasilella